Ann Henricksson and Julie Richardson were the defending champions but only Henricksson competed that year with Gretchen Magers.

Henricksson and Magers lost in the quarterfinals to Michelle Jaggard and Hu Na.

Jaggard and Na won in the final 6–3, 6–2 against Sandra Birch and Debbie Graham.

Seeds
Champion seeds are indicated in bold text while text in italics indicates the round in which those seeds were eliminated. All eight seeded teams received byes into the second round.

Draw

Final

Top half

Bottom half

External links
 1989 OTB Open Doubles Draw

Women's Doubles
Doubles